Congemi is a surname. Notable people with the surname include:

 John Congemi (born 1964), American football player and analyst
  (born 1961 or 1962), American figure skating coach